William Sharman Crawford Nicholl (1851–1937), known as Billie Nicholl was a New Zealand prospector and gold mine developer. He was born in Garvagh, County Londonderry, Northern Ireland.

References

1851 births
1937 deaths
New Zealand gold prospectors
People from County Londonderry
Irish emigrants to New Zealand (before 1923)
New Zealand miners